Banimboola Power Station is a hydroelectric power station on the Dartmouth Dam Regulating Pond (or Banimboola Pondage), downstream of Dartmouth Dam on the Mitta Mitta River in Victoria, Australia. It is owned and operated by AGL Energy.

References

Energy infrastructure completed in 2005
Hydroelectric power stations in Victoria (Australia)
Dams in the Murray River basin
2005 establishments in Australia